Kali for Women was a start-up feminist publisher in India. Urvashi Butalia and Ritu Menon set up Kali for Women in 1984, arguably the first Indian publishing house dedicated to publishing on and for women. When they decided to take this step, Butalia had worked with Oxford University Press and Zed Books in Delhi, while Ritu Menon was a scholar. They started with very little capital but with an urgent sense that they had to make Indian women's voices heard, through academic publishing and activist works, translation and fiction. They were followed by other Indian presses concerned with gender and social issues, such as Bhatkal and Sen who publish the imprints Stree and Samya and Tulika Books.

Publications
Widely regarded as India's answer to Virago Press, Kali for Women published some pathbreaking titles, among them the Hindi reference book Shareer ki Jankari ("About the Body"). Shareer ki Jankari was written by 75 village women and sold by them at a special price in the villages. Shareer ki Jankari was extremely frank about sex and women's bodies including issues such as menstrual taboos, shocking some commentators. Till then academic presses had largely ignored the markets for cheap, mass literature. (See academic books by Jyoti Puti.)

Kali for Women published Radha Kumar's The History of Doing (1993), the ecofeminist Vandana Shiva's landmark work Staying Alive (1988), and Kumkum Sangari and Sudesh Vaid's landmark Recasting Women: Essays in Colonial History (1989).

Corporate split
In 2003, the founders parted ways. Butalia set up Zubaan Books in 2003, which besides feminist books also publishes fiction, general interest books and children's titles. Menon founded Women Unlimited. The firms are active.

Award
In 2011, Urvashi Butalia and Ritu Menon were jointly conferred the Padma Shri award, for their contribution to the nation by the Government of India.

See also
Women in India

References

External links 
 Kali for Women at Spinifex
 Women Unlimited
 Zubaan Books
 Account at Pratham Books

Publishing companies of India
Feminist book publishing companies
Publishing companies established in 1984
1984 establishments in Delhi
Companies based in Delhi
2003 disestablishments in India